Permanence is the debut studio album by rock band No Devotion. It was released on 25 September 2015 through Collect Records.  It was reissued on 6 June 2022 through Velocity Records after the collapse of Collect Records.

Background
Following Lostprophets frontman Ian Watkins' incarceration for child sex offences, No Devotion was formed. Bassist Stuart Richardson explained that they were unsure "if we would ever make music again or if people would look us in the face. Everything felt like it was over." In April 2014 it was announced that Thursday frontman Geoff Rickly would be working with No Devotion through his own label, Collect Records. Rickley regarded their new material as being influenced by Joy Division, New Order, and The Cure, although he did not speculate whether or not he was going to be joining the band.

A month later, the group confirmed they would be making music with Rickly on vocals as he said they "deserved a second chance". On 1 July, the band released their first single "Stay", with B-side "Eyeshadow". In late July, the band went on a short tour. On 27 October 2014, "10,000 Summers" was released as a single with the B-sides "Only Thing" and the demo version of "10,000 Summers". In early January 2015 it was announced that drummer Luke Johnson had left the band, feeling that he would be unable to fulfill commitments. Matt Tong of Bloc Party filled in on drums to help the band finish recording their debut album. Also in January, the band supported Gerard Way on his tour of the UK.

Stuart Richardson stated in 2019 that the album was written during the period Watkins' trial was going on.

Production
When asked about what influences his song writing, Rickly replied with "Films [and] Novels. I think music is always aching for two things: narrative and visual pacing. The narrative is the job of a good singer or a truly visionary producer. The visual is often overlooked. That's why our album is so design heavy."

Permanence was mixed by Dave Fridmann  and produced by Richardson and Alex Newport.

Release
On 30 June 2015, Permanence was announced for release. On 6 July, "Addition" was released as a single. "Addition" was released to radio on 17 August. A day later, "Permanent Sunlight" was released as a single. Permanence was made available for streaming on 21 September. The album was released through Collect Records on 25 September. In October and November, the band went on a tour of Europe.

Reception

Permanence charted in the UK at number 120. "I Wanna Be Your God" was included on Alternative Presss list of "12 new songs you need to hear from September 2015".

Rock Sound reviewer Rob Sayce noted the album's fusion of "shimmering electronic textures with elements of post-punk, psychedelic pop and a hefty dose of gloom." Sayce wrote how Rickly managed to sow together the collection's "various threads with real passion and intensity." Sayce mentioned that those who grew up with The Cure's material "should feel right at home". The album was ranked at number 8 in Alternative Presss "10 Essential Records of 2015" list. Jason Pettigrew of Alternative Press wrote that the album "exceed[ed] fans' and detractors' preconceived notions with equal measures of heart-hitting pop and urbane rock cool." The album was included at number 12 on Rock Sounds top 50 releases of 2015 list. Permanence won Best Album at the 2016 Kerrang! Awards.

Track listing
All songs written by No Devotion.

"Break" – 4:17
"Permanent Sunlight" – 4:36
"Eyeshadow" – 3:50
"Why Can't I Be with You" – 4:00
"I Wanna Be Your God" – 3:58
"Death Rattle" – 2:52
"10,000 Summers" – 4:15
"Night Drive" – 6:03
"Stay" – 4:00
"Addition" – 3:36
"Grand Central" – 5:59

Personnel
No Devotion
 Geoff Rickly – lead vocals
 Jamie Oliver – vocals, piano, keyboards, synths 
 Lee Gaze – lead guitar, backing vocals
 Mike Lewis – rhythm guitar, backing vocals 
 Stuart Richardson – bass guitar, backing vocals 
 Luke Johnson – drums, percussion (tracks 3–5, 7–10 and 11)

Additional musicians
 Matt Tong – drums, percussion (tracks 1, 2, 4 and 6)

Chart positions

References
 Citations

Sources

External links

Permanence at YouTube (streamed copy where licensed)

2015 debut albums
No Devotion albums
Albums produced by Alex Newport
Albums produced by Dave Fridmann